David Gaffney Sansing (June 15, 1933 – July 6, 2019) was a history professor and author in Mississippi who wrote extensively about the state's complex history. He was a professor emeritus at the University of Mississippi at the time of his death.

Sansing was born in Greenville, Mississippi and served in the Army during the Korean War. Upon his return, he received his Bachelor and Masters degrees from Mississippi College and his PhD froom the University of Southern Mississippi. He was hired at Ole Miss in 1970. He wrote about various aspects of the state's history. Among his books is The University of Mississippi: A Sesquicentennial History, considered to be the definitive history of the university. It was published for the school's sesquicentennial.

Sansing died on July 6, 2019 at a hospital in Memphis, Tennessee following a fall at home.

Writings
Mississippi Governors: Soldiers, Statesmen, Scholars and Scoundrels
The University of Mississippi: A Sesquicentennial History
 Making Haste Slowly: The Troubled History of Higher Education in Mississippi 
 A History of the Mississippi Governor’s Mansion with Carroll Waller
Mississippi:  A Study of Your State with Ray Skates
Mississippi: Its People and Culture
Discovering Mississippi
A Troubled History: The Governance of Higher Education in Mississippi The Nautilus Publishing Company
What Was Freedom's Price, editor University of Mississippi Press (1978)
The Other Mississippi: A State in Conflict with Itself (2018)
"David Holmes, First and Fifth Governor of Mississippi: 1817-1820; 1826"

References

1933 births
2019 deaths
University of Mississippi faculty
Mississippi College alumni
University of Southern Mississippi alumni
Historians of Mississippi
People from Greenville, Mississippi
20th-century American historians
Historians from Mississippi
21st-century American male writers
20th-century American male writers
21st-century American historians
American male non-fiction writers